The following is a list of notable deaths in August 2000.

Entries for each day are listed alphabetically by surname. A typical entry lists information in the following sequence:
 Name, age, country of citizenship at birth, subsequent country of citizenship (if applicable), reason for notability, cause of death (if known), and reference.

August 2000

1
Maxie Berger, 83, Canadian boxer.
Robert A. Brooks, 68, American telecommunications entrepreneur, cancer.
Joanna Constantinidis, 72, English potter and ceramic artist.
Nanjil K. Manoharan, 71, Indian politician, cardiac arrest.
Stan Seltzer, 72, American jazz pianist.
Anatoly Zinevich, 67, Soviet, and later Armenian General-Lieutenant.

2
John Caldwell, 65, Australian politician.
William Rossa Cole, 80, American anthologist, columnist, and writer of light verse.
Trevor Leggett, 85, British author and translator, stroke.
Patricia Moyes, 77, British mystery writer.
Floyd Swink, 79, American botanist and author.

3
Isolina Ferré, 85, Puerto Rican Roman Catholic religious sister.
Joann Lõssov, 78, Estonian basketball player.
Michael Meyer, 79, English translator and writer.
Geoffrey Page, 80, British World War II flying ace.

4
Jimmy Bowie, 75, Scottish footballer.
John Joseph Graham, 86, American Roman Catholic prelate.
Fred W. Hooper, 102, American racehorse owner and breeder.
Oleg Kuznetsov, 31, Soviet-Russian serial killer and rapist, heart failure.
Halyna Zubchenko, 71, Ukrainian painter, muralist, and social activist.

5
Lala Amarnath, 88, Indian cricketer.
Otto Buchsbaum, 80, Austrian-Brazilian writer and ecological activist.
Sir Alec Guinness, 86, English actor and writer, Star Wars: Original Trilogy, Oliver Twist, Great Expectations, liver cancer.
Dudley Randall, 86, African-American poet.
Edgardo Sogno, 84, Italian diplomat, partisan and political figure.

6
Raymond J. Broderick, 86, jurist and politician from Pennsylvania, cancer.
Lillian Chestney, 86, American illustrator and painter.
Sir Robin Day, 76, British political broadcaster, heart complications.
Marv Felderman, 84, American baseball player.
Don A. Jones, 87, officer in the US Coast and Geodetic Survey Corps.

7
Samuel Akpabot, 63, Nigerian music composer, ethnomusicologist and author.
Georges Matheron, 69, French mathematician and geologist.
Mona-Lisa Pursiainen, 49, Finnish female sprinter, breast cancer.
Mary Anne MacLeod Trump, 88, mother of Donald Trump.

8
Katherine Butler, 86, nun, writer, and aviator.
Walter Chappell, 75, American photographer and poet, lung cancer.
Ernie Hefferle, 85, American football player and coach.
Sir Peter Hudson, 76, British army general.
Jaap Marais, 77, Afrikaner nationalist thinker, author and politician.
S. Nijalingappa, 97, Indian politician.
Anatoli Romashin, 69, Soviet and Russian actor and director, accidental impalement.
Thomas B. Warren, 80, American professor of philosophy of religion and apologetics.

9
Sir Josias Cunningham, 66, Northern Irish politician.
John Harsanyi, 80, Hungarian-born economist, Nobel Prize laureate.
Bob Lido, 85, American musician (The Lawrence Welk Show).
William Longgood, 82, American journalist and writer.
Louis Nucéra, 72, French writer, traffic accident.
Vitaliy Starukhin, 51, Ukrainian professional footballer, pneumonia.
Herb Thomas, 77, American NASCAR driver and member of the NASCAR Hall of Fame, heart attack.
Lewis Wilson, 80, American actor.

10
Robert Manuel Cook, 91, British classical scholar.
Joan Marsh, 87, American child actress in silent films.
Milt Mead, 68, American track athlete and basketball player.
Gilbert Parkhouse, 74, Welsh cricketer.
Hatto Ständer, 71, German church musician, academic, concert organist and composer.

11
Paidi Jairaj, 90, Indian film actor, director and producer.
Talal Maddah, 60, Saudi musician and composer, heart attack.
Usha Mehta, 80, India Gandhian and freedom fighter.
Jean Papineau-Couture, 83, Canadian composer.
Constantin Zureiq, Syrian Arab intellectual.

12
Alberto Pedro Cabrera, 54, Argentine basketball player, leukemia.
Dave Edwards, 59, American big band-style musician, cardiac arrest.
Gennady Lyachin, 45, Russian commanding officer of the sank submarine Kursk.
Jeanne Rhéaume, 85, Canadian artist.
Loretta Young, 87, American actress (The Farmer's Daughter, Come to the Stable).

13
Edgar Claxton, 90, British rail engineer.
Sir Antony Duff, 80, British diplomat, Director-General of MI5 (1985-1988).
Terence Feely, 72, British screenwriter, playwright and author.
Nazia Hassan, 35, Pakistani pop singer-songwriter, lawyer and social activist, lung cancer.

14
Walter Benton, 69, American jazz tenor saxophonist.
John Boland, 55, Irish politician.
Ken Heintzelman, 84, American baseball player.
Harry Kinsell, 79, English footballer.
Vera Nikolaevna Maslennikova, 74, Russian mathematician.
Cuan McCarthy, 71, South African cricketer.
John Milford, 70, American actor, skin cancer.
Hawa Singh, 62, Indian heavyweight boxer.
Rostislav Vovkushevsky, 83, Soviet/Russian painter.

15
Ena Begović, 40, Croatian actress, traffic accident.
Vasilis Efraimidis, 84, Greek journalist and politician.
Edward Craven Walker, 82, British inventor who invented the lava lamp.
Lancelot Ware, 85, British founder of Mensa.
John Whitehead, 74, English cricketer.

16
Alan Caddy, 60, English guitarist (The Tornados).
Grace Halsell, 77, American journalist and writer.
S. C. C. Anthony Pillai, 86, Indian trade unionist and politician, cardiac arrest.
Renu Saluja, 48, Indian film editor, stomach cancer.

17
Robert R. Gilruth, 86, American aerospace engineer.
Edith Körner, 79, Czech-born British health reformer, suicide.
Stephan Körner, 86, Czech-born British philosopher, suicide.
Emil Petaja, 85, American science fiction and fantasy writer, heart failure.
Leslie Rees, 94, Australian children's author and writer.
Hans-Diedrich von Tiesenhausen, 87, Baltic German Kapitänleutnant during World War II.
Jack Walker, 71, British industrialist and businessman, cancer.

18
Cesar Calvo, 60,  Peruvian poet, journalist and author.
Lakshyadhar Choudhury, 85, Indian actor, playwright, film-director and politician.
Joseph Comerford, 41, British engineer.
Claire Epstein, 88, Israeli archaeologist.
Maurice Evans, 63, English football player and manager,  heart attack.
Bernard Krainis, 75, American musician.
Ola Rotimi, 62, Nigerian  playwright and theatre director.
Morton Shulman, 75, Canadian politician, businessman and physician.
Dorothy Mae Taylor, 72, American politician and educator.
Bill Willesee, 88, Australian politician.

19
Bineshwar Brahma, 52, Bodo activist and leader.
David Norton Edelstein, 90, American judge.
Harry Oppenheimer, 91, South African businessman, industrialist and philanthropist.
Antonio Pugliese, 59, Italian-born Canadian professional wrestler known as Tony Parisi, aneurysm.

20
Jorge Alberto Ramos Comas, 53, Puerto Rican politician.
Sir Peter Compston, 84, British admiral.
Jackie Coulter, 46, Northern Irish loyalist, killed.
Nancy Evans, 85, British mezzo-soprano opera singer.
Mitch Halpern, 33, American boxing referee, self-inflicted gunshot to the head.
Douglas T. Jacobson, 74, United States Marine and recipient of the Medal of Honor.
Bill Simon, 80, American songwriter, musician and music critic.
Henri Theil, 75, Dutch econometrician.

21
Sir Campbell Adamson, 78, British industrialist.
Tom Day, 65, American football player.
John Hayes, 70, American film director.
Russ Kerns, 79, American baseball player.
Daniel Lisulo, 69, Zambian politician.
Giuseppe Medici, 92, Italian politician.

22
Bill Bradford, 78, American baseball player.
Abulfaz Elchibey, 62, Azerbaijani political figure and a Soviet dissident, prostate cancer.
Professor Tanaka, 70, American actor and professional wrestler.

23
George Barnes, 73, Australian boxer.
Betty Blue, 69, American model and actress.
Muriel Bowen, 74, Irish journalist and politician, complications from a blood disorder.
Anthony Corallo, 87, American mobster and boss of the Lucchese crime family.
John Anthony Kaiser, 67, American priest, assassinated.
Rangarajan Kumaramangalam, 48, Indian politician, acute myeloid leukaemia.

24
Andy Hug, 35, Swiss kickboxer.
Bob McPhail, 94, Scottish footballer.
Tatiana Riabouchinska, 83, Russian American prima ballerina.

25
Carl Barks, 99, American cartoonist (Scrooge McDuck).
Amalia de la Vega, 81, Uruguayan singer.
Jack Nitzsche, 63, American musician, arranger and songwriter (Academy Award for Best Original Song for co-writing "Up Where We Belong").
Ginetta Sagan, 75, Italian-born American human rights activist.
Ivan Stambolić, 63, Serbian politician.
Ian Stephenson, 66, British artist.

26
Bunny Austin, 94, English tennis player.
Odette Joyeux, 85, French actress, playwright and novelist.
Balan K. Nair, 67, Indian actor.
Lynden Pindling, 70, Bahamian politician and Prime Minister, prostate cancer.
Ilija Monte Radlovic, 86, British Army officer and author.
Ed Rakow, 65, American baseball player.
Sergio Silva, Uruguayan footballer.
Daniel Sternberg, 87, Polish musician.
Allen Woody, 44, American bass guitarist (the Allman Brothers Band, Gov't Mule), heroin overdose.

27
Deister, 29, German show jumping horse and  European Champion.
Gilbert de Botton, 65, Israeli financial pioneer.
Denny Chronopoulos, 32, Canadian football player, heart attack.
Bob Mahoney, 72, American baseball player.
Euclid Rains, 79, American politician.

28
Antoni Janusz, 98, Polish sportsman, soldier and pilot.
Milan Levar, 45–46, Croatian army officer and whistleblower, murdered.
Khaya Majola, 47, South African cricket player, colon cancer.

29
Fern Bell, 87, American baseball player.
Shelagh Fraser, 79, British actress (best known for playing Aunt Beru in Star Wars).
Mohamed Hamri, 68, Moroccan painter and writer.
Rose Hobart, 94, American actress and Screen Actors Guild official.
Conrad Marca-Relli, 87, American artist.
John Whitfield, 82, Australian rugby player.

30
David R. Altman, 85, American advertising executive, lymphoma.
David Haskell, 52, American actor and singer, brain cancer.
Joseph H. Lewis, 93, American B-movie film director.
Willie Maddren, 49, English professional football player and manager.
Hideo Sasaki, 80, American landscape architect.
Gürdal Tosun, 33, Turkish actor (Bir Demet Tiyatro), kidney failure.

31
K. K. Balakrishnan, Indian politician, heart attack.
Joseph Lennox Federal, 90, American Roman Catholic prelate.
Thomas Fitton, 89, Anglo-Irish cricketer and Royal Air Force officer.
Lucille Fletcher, 88, American screenwriter, stroke.
Joan Hartigan, 88, Australian tennis player.
Les Johnson, 84, Australian public servant and diplomat.
Saunders King, 91, American guitarist and singer.
Brian Murphy, 18, Irish victim of unlawful killing.
Dolores Moore, 67, All-American Girls Professional Baseball League player.
Geoffrey Rock, 77, English-Canadian painter.
Patricia Owens, 75, Canadian-born American actress.
Yisha'ayahu Schwager, 54, Israeli footballer, heart attack.
John Alexander Simpson, 83, American physicist and science educator, pneumonia.
Euan Uglow, 68, British painter, cancer.

References 

2000-08
 08